The Wildnis Trail is a long-distance hiking path in the Eifel National Park in North Rhine-Westphalia, Germany. The path is 85 km long and leads through the entire national park from Southwest to Northeast. The trail brings the hiker through all different zones of the national park. These include forest, heath, grassland, artificial lakes and mountain streams.

Stages

The national park proposes to complete the path in 4 one-day stages with each a length between 18 and 25 km.

 Höfen - Einruhr: 24,7 km
 Einruhr - Gemünd: 20,5 km
 Gemünd - Heimbach: 22,4 km
 Heimbach - Zerkall: 17,7 km

Eifel
Hiking trails in North Rhine-Westphalia